Ch'uxña Quta (Aymara ch'uxña green, quta lake, "green lake", also spelled Chojña Kkota) is a  mountain in the Andes of Bolivia. It is situated in the La Paz Department, Larecaja Province, Sorata Municipality. Ch'uxña Quta lies in the northern extensions of the Cordillera Real southeast of the mountains Ch'uch'u and Ch'uch'u Apachita and northwest of Llawi Imaña.

References 

Mountains of La Paz Department (Bolivia)